Jozef Palatinus (born 8 August 1969) is a Slovak wrestler. He competed in the men's freestyle 90 kg at the 1992 Summer Olympics.

References

1969 births
Living people
Slovak male sport wrestlers
Olympic wrestlers of Czechoslovakia
Wrestlers at the 1992 Summer Olympics
People from Žarnovica District
Sportspeople from the Banská Bystrica Region